The Asian golden cat (Catopuma temminckii) is a medium-sized wild cat native to the northeastern Indian subcontinent, Southeast Asia and China. It has been listed as Near Threatened on the IUCN Red List since 2008, and is threatened by poaching and habitat destruction, since Southeast Asian forests are undergoing the world's fastest regional deforestation.

The Asian golden cat's scientific name honours Coenraad Jacob Temminck. It is also called Temminck's cat and Asiatic golden cat.

Taxonomy
Felis temmincki was the scientific name used in 1827 by Nicholas Aylward Vigors and Thomas Horsfield who described a reddish brown cat skin from Sumatra.
Felis moormensis proposed by Brian Houghton Hodgson in 1831 was a young male cat caught alive by Moormi hunters in Nepal. Felis tristis proposed by Alphonse Milne-Edwards in 1872 was a spotted Asian golden cat from China.

It was subordinated to the genus Catopuma proposed by Nikolai Severtzov in 1853.
Two subspecies are recognised as valid since 2017:
 C. t. temminckii occurs in Sumatra and the Malay Peninsula
 C. t. moormensis occurs from Nepal eastwards to Southeast Asia

Phylogeny 
Both models agree that the marbled cat is the first species of this lineage that diverged, while the Asian golden cat and the bay cat diverged from each other about 

The following cladogram shows the phylogenetic relationships of the Asian golden cat:

Characteristics

The Asian golden cat is polymorphic in colour. Golden, reddish brown and buff brown individuals were recorded in northeastern India and Bhutan.
Reddish brown morphs were recorded in Sumatra.
Melanistic individuals were recorded in the eastern Himalayas, and in Sumatra.
A spotted Asian golden cat with large rosettes on shoulders, flanks and hips was described for the first time based on a specimen from China in 1872. This morph was recorded in China, Bhutan and in West Bengal's Buxa Tiger Reserve.

Distribution and habitat
The Asian golden cat ranges from eastern Nepal, northeastern India and Bhutan to Bangladesh, Myanmar, Thailand, Cambodia, Laos, Vietnam, southern China, Malaysia and Sumatra. It prefers forest habitats interspersed with rocky areas and inhabits dry deciduous, subtropical evergreen and tropical rainforests.

Since an individual was caught alive in 1831 in Nepal, the country was thought to be the westernmost part of the Asian golden cat's range.

In India, Asian golden cats were recorded in:
 open grasslands of Assam's Manas National Park;
 the Khasi hills of Meghalaya;
 Mizoram's Dampa Tiger Reserve;
 Arunachal Pradesh's Talley Valley Wildlife Sanctuary, Pakke Tiger Reserve, Eaglenest Wildlife Sanctuary and Singchung-Bugun Village Community Reserve.

In northern Myanmar, it was recorded in Hkakaborazi National Park.
In 2015, it was recorded for the first time in the hill forests of Karen State.

In Laos, it also inhabits bamboo regrowth, scrub and degraded forest from the Mekong plains to at least .

In China, it was recorded in protected areas in the Qinling and Minshan Mountains between 2004 and 2009.

Results of surveys in Sumatra indicated that it is more common than sympatric small cats, suggesting that it is more numerous than thought before the turn of the 21st century. It has been recorded in Kerinci Seblat Gunung Leuser and Bukit Barisan Selatan National Parks.

Behaviour and ecology 

Asian golden cats are territorial and solitary. Previous observations suggested that they are primarily nocturnal, but a field study on two radio-collared specimens revealed arrhythmic activity patterns dominated by crepuscular and diurnal activity peaks, with much less activity late at night.
Asian golden cats recorded in northeast India were active during the day with activity peaks around noon.

Asian golden cats can climb trees when necessary. They hunt birds, hares, rodents, reptiles, and small ungulates such as muntjacs and young sambar deer. They are capable of bringing down prey much larger than themselves, such as domestic water buffalo calves. In the mountains of Sikkim, Asian golden cats reportedly prey on ghoral.

Captive Asian golden cats kill small prey with the nape bite typical of cats. They also pluck birds larger than pigeons before beginning to feed. Their vocalizations include hissing, spitting, meowing, purring, growling, and gurgling. Other methods of communication observed in captive Asian golden cats include scent marking, urine spraying, raking trees and logs with claws, and rubbing of the head against various objects – much like a domestic cat.

Reproduction 
Not much is known about the reproductive behavior of this rather elusive cat in the wild. Most of what is known has been learned from cats in captivity. Female Asian golden cats are sexually mature between 18 and 24 months, while males mature at 24 months. Females come into estrus every 39 days, at which time they leave markings and seek contact with the male by adopting receptive postures. During intercourse, the male will seize the skin of the neck of the female with his teeth. After a gestation period of 78 to 80 days, the female gives birth in a sheltered place to a litter of one to three kittens. The kittens weigh  at birth, but triple in size over the first eight weeks of life. They are born already possessing the adult coat pattern and open their eyes after six to twelve days. In captivity, they live for up to twenty years.

Threats 
The Asian golden cat inhabits some of the fastest developing countries in the world, where it is increasingly threatened by habitat destruction following deforestation, along with a declining ungulate prey base. In Sumatra, it has been reported killed in revenge for preying on poultry. In Southeast Asia and China, it is threatened by poaching for the illegal wildlife trade. This trade has the greatest potential to do maximum harm in minimal time.

Illegal wildlife trade 
Asian golden cats are poached mainly for their fur. In Myanmar, 111 body parts from at least 110 individuals were observed in four markets surveyed between 1991 and 2006. Numbers were significantly greater than those of non-threatened species. Among the observed skins was one with rosettes. Three of the surveyed markets are situated on international borders with China and Thailand and cater to international buyers, although the Asian golden cat is completely protected under the country's national legislation. Effective implementation and enforcement of CITES is considered inadequate.

Conservation
Pardofelis temminckii is included in CITES Appendix I and fully protected over most of its range. Hunting is prohibited in Bangladesh, China, India, Indonesia, Malaysia, Myanmar, Nepal, Thailand and Vietnam. Hunting is regulated in Laos. No information about protection status is available from Cambodia. In Bhutan, it is protected only within the boundaries of protected areas.

In captivity 
, there were 20 Asian golden cats in eight European zoos participating in the European Endangered Species Programme. The pair in the German Wuppertal Zoo successfully bred in 2007, and in July 2008, two siblings were born and mother-reared. In 2008, a female kitten was also born in the French Parc des Félins. The species is also kept in the Singapore Zoo. Apart from these, a few zoos in Southeast Asia and Australia also keep Asian golden cats.

Local names
In China, the Asian golden cat is thought to be a kind of leopard and is known as "rock cat" or "yellow leopard". Different colour phases have different names; those with black fur are called "inky leopards", and those with spotted coats are called "sesame leopards".

In some regions of Thailand, the Asian golden cat is called Seua fai ("fire tiger"). According to a regional legend, the burning of an Asian golden cat's fur drives tigers away. Eating the flesh is believed to have the same effect. The Karen people believe that carrying a single hair of the cat is sufficient. Many indigenous people believe the cat to be fierce, but in captivity it has been known to be docile and tranquil. In the south, it is called Kang kude and believed to be a fierce animal that can hurt or eat livestock and larger animals such as elephants.

References

External links

Felines
Mammals described in 1827
Taxa named by Nicholas Aylward Vigors
Mammals of Nepal
Mammals of India
Mammals of Bhutan
Mammals of Bangladesh
Mammals of Myanmar
Mammals of Thailand
Mammals of Laos
Mammals of Vietnam
Mammals of China
Carnivorans of Malaysia
Mammals of Indonesia